Billardiera sericophora is a small spreading shrub in the family Pittosporaceae. The species is endemic to South Australia. Cream to yellow or pale purple flowers appear between August and December in the species' native range. These are followed by cylindrical berries that are about 25 mm long and 8 mm in diameter.
The species was formally described by botanist Ferdinand von Mueller in 1852 following its discovery during a botanical survey of Port Lincoln by Carl Wilhelmi.

References

External links
 
 

sericophora
Flora of South Australia
Taxa named by Ferdinand von Mueller